Mary Pickering may refer to:
 Evelyn De Morgan (Mary Evelyn Pickering, 1855–1919), English painter
 Mary Pickering Nichols (1829–1915), American translator of German literature